Servir y proteger is a Spanish police drama soap opera produced by Plano a Plano for Televisión Española. The series premiered on La1 on 24 April 2017. It tells the daily routine of a CNP police station on Madrid.

The first season was broadcast from 24 April 2017 to 15 February 2018 and the soap opera was renewed in late 2017 for a second season which started on February 16. It was renewed for a third season in May 2018. A fourth season was approved in June 2019. It was renewed for a fifth season in August 2020. A sixth season was approved in June 2021. A seventh season was approved in May 2022.

Plot
The series is about the day to day of a police station in a neighbourhood south of Madrid. The cases investigated by police officers are less serious offenses, although they have a great impact on the lives of those affected: small conflicts of a social nature, with immigrants, evictions, or violence against women. With the police station as the centre of the plot, it shows the characters, their problems, anxieties, hopes and joys.

Cast
Current main cast

Departed main cast

Awards and nominations 

|-
| align = "center" | 2021 || 8th  || colspan = "2" | Best Daily Series ||  || 
|}

See also
 Radiotelevisión Española
 Television in Spain
 Seis Hermanas

References

External links
 Servir y proteger Website
 Servir y proteger at the Internet Movie Database

Spanish television soap operas
La 1 (Spanish TV channel) network series
2017 Spanish television series debuts
Spanish-language television shows
2010s Spanish drama television series
2020s Spanish drama television series
Television shows set in Madrid
Television series by Plano a Plano